Sport Voetbal Centro Social Deportivo Barber is a Curaçao football team located in northern town of Barber, and playing in the Curaçao League First Division.

Achievements
Kopa Antiano: 8
 2002, 2003, 2004, 2005, 2006, 2007, 2008, 2010

Sekshon Pagá: 6
 2002, 2003, 2004, 2005, 2007, 2014

Sekshon Amatùr: 1
 1995

Performance in CONCACAF competitions
CFU Club Championship: 6 appearances 2003, 2005, 2006, 2007, 2009, 2010
2003 – First Round – (Caribbean Zone) – Lost against  Portmore United 3–1 in the global result.
2005 – Semi-finals – (Caribbean Zone) – Lost against  Portmore United 3–2 in the global result.
2006 – First Round group stage – (Caribbean Zone) – hosted by  Harbour View in Jamaica
2007 – First Round group stage – (Caribbean Zone) – hosted by  San Juan Jabloteh in Trinidad and Tobago
2009 – First Round – (Caribbean Zone) – Lost against  Inter Moengotapoe 3–2 in the global result.
2010 – First Round group stage – (Caribbean Zone) – hosted by  Hubentut Fortuna in Netherlands Antilles.

Current squad 2015-16

References

Football clubs in Curaçao
Football clubs in the Netherlands Antilles
Association football clubs established in 1951
1951 establishments in Curaçao